Mark Lewisohn (born 16 June 1958) is an English historian and biographer. Since the 1980s, he has written many reference books about the Beatles and has worked for EMI, MPL Communications and Apple Corps. He has been referred to as the world's leading authority on the band due to his meticulous research and integrity. His works include The Complete Beatles Recording Sessions (1988), a history of the group's session dates, and The Beatles: All These Years (2013–present), a three-volume series intended as the group's most comprehensive biography.

The Beatles and related subjects

Early books

Lewisohn has been writing about the Beatles since 1977, when he became a contributor to the fanzine Beatles Monthly. The fanzine commissioned him to answer fan letters after he won a quiz at the first London Beatles convention. When he began researching the band, he "found that it was a deep and rewarding history that was, for the most part, not very well researched by anybody else, so I just found a career by becoming a Beatles expert, I suppose you would say. Writing books and consulting on TV series, and ended up working for them. It's ridiculous. One thing just led to the next."

His 1986 book The Beatles Live! featured a complete history of all the Beatles' live performances, in a format which Lewisohn would follow for his subsequent books. After being invited by EMI to listen to all of the Beatles' original session tapes, Lewisohn wrote The Complete Beatles Recording Sessions (1988). The book was in the form of a diary, listing chronologically every recording session the Beatles had at Abbey Road Studios. It included details such as who played on each track and how many takes were recorded in each session. The book featured an introductory interview by Paul McCartney.

The Beatles: 25 Years in the Life (1988) included information on what each individual member of the band was doing on any particular day between 1962 and 1987. This book was republished as The Beatles Day by Day in 1990. The Complete Beatles Chronicle was published in 1992 and went one step further, detailing the band's entire career in the studio, on stage, and on radio, television, film and video. Lewisohn's next book was The Beatles' London, which he co-authored with Piet Schreuders and Adam Smith, published in 1994. This is essentially a guide book to all the Beatles-related locations in London, including Abbey Road and the London Palladium, featuring maps and photographs of the band at the locations mentioned. A revised version of the book was published in early 2008.

Other contributions
As well as writing his own books, Lewisohn has written forewords to such books as Recording The Beatles by Brian Kehew and Kevin Ryan, Beatles Gear by Andy Babiuk and the German book Komm, gib mir deine Hand by Thorsten Knublauch and Axel Korinth. He has also contributed to In My Life: Lennon Remembered, a book to accompany the 10-part BBC radio series about John Lennon, and edited McCartney's book Wingspan, after working for a long time as editor and writer for McCartney's (now ceased) fanzine Club Sandwich. This led to him being invited by the former Beatle to write the liner notes for several of his albums, namely Flaming Pie, Band on the Run: 25th Anniversary Edition and Wingspan: Hits and History. He also wrote the liner notes for the retrospective six-CD box set Produced by George Martin – 50 Years in Recording, and the Beatles' albums 1 and The Capitol Albums, Volume 1. He was heavily involved in The Beatles Anthology project.

According to Daniel Finkelstein, writing in The Times in 2014, Lewisohn was responsible for identifying comedian Jasper Carrott as the source in 1983 of the famous remark, "Ringo isn't the best drummer in the world. He isn't even the best drummer in the Beatles." This observation has generally been attributed to John Lennon, but Lewisohn had been doubtful because he could find no record of his having said it and thought it was out of character for Lennon to say something that he did not actually believe, though he was also well known for making mischievous remarks.  However, Lewisohn has since confirmed that the line actually originated in a 1981 episode of the BBC radio comedy series Radio Active, written by Angus Deayton and Geoffrey Perkins.

The Beatles: All These Years

In 2005, Lewisohn announced that he had started work on a three-volume Beatles biography. He was quoted as saying of the work:

 Volume 1 was published in October 2013, entitled The Beatles: All These Years, Volume One – Tune In. Lewisohn was quoted as saying "It took longer to research and write than I could ever have anticipated". In an interview published on 28 December 2013, Lewisohn estimated that the second volume would be published in 2020 and the final volume in 2028 ("about the time he turns 70"). However, in August 2018 Lewisohn tweeted that it was "way too early to say" when he would be able to publish Volume 2.

In autumn 2019 Lewisohn toured a one-man show, Hornsey Road, around theatres in England, also stopping at Dublin and Edinburgh. The 25-date tour was an multimedia history lecture about the Beatles' last-made album, Abbey Road. The tour title referred to EMI's 1956–57 purchase of a recording studio in Holloway, north London, where the Beatles would have recorded had EMI not altered its course and decided to keep all company recording at the existing studio on Abbey Road. The revenue from the tour, which sold out several of its venues, helped fund Lewisohn's work on the remaining volumes of The Beatles: All These Years.

Other work
Although the Beatles are Lewisohn's area of particular expertise, he has also written on a variety of other subjects. One of his best-known works is an encyclopaedia of comedy on British television screens titled Radio Times Guide to TV Comedy, published in 1998 and updated in 2003, also available online as the BBC Guide to Comedy until 2007. He has also written Funny, Peculiar, a biography of Benny Hill, published in 2002.

In the past, Lewisohn has written for magazines, including the Radio Times and Match of the Day. He also helped to edit the book Hendrix: Setting The Record Straight, written by John McDermott and Eddie Kramer.

Personal life

Lewisohn is Jewish.

Bibliography
 The Beatles Live! (1986)
 The Beatles: 25 Years in the Life (1987)
 The Complete Beatles Recording Sessions (1988)
 The Complete Beatles Chronicle (1992)
 Radio Times Guide to TV Comedy (1998)
 Funny, Peculiar: The True Story of Benny Hill (2002)
 Radio Times Guide to TV Comedy (2nd edition, 2003)
 The Beatles: All These Years
 Volume One – Tune In (2013)
 The Beatles A Hard Day's Night: A Private Archive (2016)
 An Englishman in Mons (2017)

As coauthor
 In My Life: John Lennon Remembered (1990)
 The Beatles' London (1994)
 The Beatles' London (2nd edition, 2008)

As editor
 Wingspan: Paul McCartney's Band On The Run (2002)

References

External links
 www.marklewisohn.net

1958 births
Living people
English music historians
English male non-fiction writers
British Jews
Place of birth missing (living people)
20th-century English historians
20th-century English male writers
21st-century English historians
21st-century English male writers